Ano or ANO may refer to:

A. N. Other, a placeholder name or pseudonym used by a person wishing to be anonymous
ANO 2011, a Czech political party
Abu Nidal Organization (or Fatah), a Palestinian nationalist militant group
Akhurian River or Ano Jur, in the South Caucasus
Alliance of the New Citizen, a Slovak political party
Anoctamins or ANOs, a calcium-activated chloride channel family
Arkansas Nuclear One, a nuclear power plant near Russellville, Arkansas
"Un Año", a 2019 song of Sebastian Yatra and Reik
Ano, wife of Jeroboam, according to the Septuagint

See also
Anno (disambiguation)